Vandiyur is a census town in Madurai district in the Indian state of Tamil Nadu.

Demographics
 India census, Vandiyur had a population of 21,464. Males constitute 51% of the population and females 49%. Vandiyur has an average literacy rate of 72%, higher than the national average of 59.5%: male literacy is 77%, and female literacy is 66%. In Vandiyur, 12% of the population is under 6 years of age.

References

Cities and towns in Madurai district